Sione Siale Fohe, styled Lord Fohe, is a Tongan noble, politician, and Cabinet minister.

He was appointed to the title of Lord Fohe in November 2016. In October 2021 he was fined TOP$500 for assaulting a tenant on his estate.

He was first elected to the Legislative Assembly of Tonga at the 2021 Tongan general election. On 29 July 2022 he was appointed Minister for Agriculture, Food, and Forests, replacing Viliami Hingano.

References

Living people
Tongan nobles
Members of the Legislative Assembly of Tonga
Year of birth missing (living people)